In enzymology, a dolichyl-xylosyl-phosphate-protein xylosyltransferase is an enzyme that catalyzes the chemical reaction

dolichyl D-xylosyl phosphate + protein  dolichyl phosphate + D-xylosylprotein

Thus, the two substrates of this enzyme are dolichyl D-xylosyl phosphate and protein, whereas its two products are dolichyl phosphate and D-xylosylprotein.

This enzyme belongs to the family of glycosyltransferases, specifically the pentosyltransferases.  The systematic name of this enzyme class is dolichyl-D-xylosyl-phosphate:protein D-xylosyltransferase.

References

 

EC 2.4.2
Enzymes of unknown structure